Pranita Talukdar was an Indian teacher, social worker and politician belonging to Indian National Congress. She was elected as a member of Assam Legislative Assembly as an Indian National Congress candidate from Sorbhog twice.

Biography
Talukdar was born in 1935. Her husband Ghaneshyam Talukdar was a member of Assam Legislative Assembly who established Barnagar College.

Talukdar was the headmistress of Sorali Higher Secondary School and teacher of Barnagar College and Barpeta Sorali College.

Talukdar was elected as a member of the Assam Legislative Assembly from Sorbhog in 1967. She was elected again from Sorbhog in 1972.

Talukdar also worked for women. She was the president of the Central Women and Children Welfare Association. She received Stree Shakti Puraskar in 2013 for her contribution to women's empowerment.

Talukdar died on 20 April 2019.

References

2019 deaths
1935 births
Indian National Congress politicians from Assam
Women members of the Assam Legislative Assembly
Nari Shakti Puraskar winners
Indian women academics
Assam MLAs 1967–1972
Assam MLAs 1972–1978